Sunzhensky District (Šolža šaꜧar) is an administrative and municipal district (raion), one of the four in the Republic of Ingushetia, Russia. It is made up of territory that was formerly part of the Sunzha Cossack Okrug . It is located in the eastern and central parts of the republic. Its administrative center is the town of Sunzha (called stanitsa Ordzhonikidzevskaya before 2016). As of the 2010 Census, the total population of the district was 116,470, with the population of Sunzha accounting for 52.9% of that number.

Administrative and municipal status
Within the framework of administrative divisions, Sunzhensky District is one of the four in the Republic of Ingushetia and has administrative jurisdiction over all of its eleven rural localities. As a municipal division, the district is incorporated as Sunzhensky Municipal District. Its eleven rural localities are incorporated into eleven rural settlements within the municipal district. The stanitsa of Sunzha serves as the administrative center of both the administrative and municipal district.

Border issues
Sunzhensky and Malgobeksky Districts are a point at issue in the Chechen-Ingush border delimitation discussion.

References

Notes

Sources

Districts of Ingushetia